Örencik can refer to the following villages in Turkey:

 Örencik, Bolu
 Örencik, Bozdoğan
 Örencik, Çorum
 Örencik, Daday
 Örencik, Gerede
 Örencik, Gölbaşı
 Örencik, Göynük
 Örencik, Hocalar
 Örencik, Karacabey
 Örencik, Kargı
 Örencik, Kastamonu
 Örencik, Kazan
 Örencik, Kızılcahamam
 Örencik, Mudurnu
 Örencik, Palu
 Örencik, Şanlıurfa
 Örencik, Vezirköprü
 Örencik, Yenice
 Örencik, Yeşilova
 Örencik, Zonguldak